The 2004 World's Strongest Man was the 27th edition of World's Strongest Man and was won by Vasyl Virastyuk from Ukraine. It was his first title after finishing third the previous year. Zydrunas Savickas from Lithuania finished second for the third year in a row. Originally Mariusz Pudzianowski from Poland finished third, but was later disqualified after testing positive for a banned substance, thus third place was given to Magnus Samuelsson from Sweden. The contest was held in Nassau, Bahamas. The qualifying heats saw a major format change, going from the traditional 5-6 man heats with the top 2 going to the finals. This year's format was a 12-man round-robin competition taking place over 5 days, with the top six going onto the finals.

Qualifying heats

Events: Deadlift with Barrels Machine, Squat Lift with Barrels Machine, Safe Lift for reps, Truck Pull, Super Yoke, Giant Farmer's Walk, Carry & Drag (Carry an Anchor & Drag Chain & Anchor), Fingal's Fingers, Wrestling, Stone Circle, Atlas Stones

Final results

Events: Carry Race (Carry an Anchor & Giant Farmer's Walk), Fridge Carry (Super Yoke), Squat Lift with Barrels Machine, Car Deadlift for reps, Safe Lift for reps, Truck Pull, Wheelbarrow Race, Atlas Stones

References

External links
 Official site

2004 in sports
World's Strongest Man